The men's 500 metres speed skating competition of the Vancouver 2010 Olympics was held at Richmond Olympic Oval on 15 February 2010.

Track maintenance issues
Competition was stopped for approximately ninety minutes during the first run, due to concerns over the naturally deteriorating quality of the ice after so many skaters had raced on it and the seeming inability of resurfacing equipment to do anything about it.  The two ice resurfacing machines prepared to maintain the surface of the ice track both malfunctioned.  A reserve machine was employed, but it left the ice surface too rough and pitted to permit safe racing by the athletes.  Finally, one of the original two machines was repaired sufficiently to fix the track.  Said Arie Koops, director of Dutch speed skating of the delay and who felt that the third machine wasn't properly prepared, "When skaters are not prepared for a race you don't send them out. It should be the same with the resurfacing machine.  If one machine was broken, they should have prepared the third. It was standing there in the garage. I have never seen anything like this."  A Zamboni brand resurfacer is being brought in from Calgary for the remainder of the games. American skater Shani Davis withdrew from the event, citing fatigue.

Records
Prior to this competition, the existing world and Olympic records were as follows.

500 meters (1 race)

500 meters x 2 (2 races)

No new world or Olympic records were set during this competition. The track records of 34.80 s and 69.73 s set by Lee Kang-seok on 15 March 2009 were also not broken.

Results

References

External links
 

Men's speed skating at the 2010 Winter Olympics